Amara Deepam is a 1956 Indian Tamil-language romantic drama film directed by T. Prakash Rao. A remake of the 1942 American film Random Harvest, it stars Sivaji Ganesan, Savitri and Padmini. The film, produced by Venus Pictures, was released on 29 June 1956. It was remade in Hindi as Amardeep (1958).

Plot 

Aruna is a girl from a wealthy family. Her parents want her to marry her cousin Sukumar. She, however, does not like him because of his dictatorial behaviour. He even breaks her radio, which convinces Aruna that he is certainly not the person for her. She leaves the house one night without informing anyone to escape from the marriage. She ends up being chased by some goons, and gets saved by a bypasser Ashok. Suddenly, somebody hits Ashok on the head, which causes him to lose his memory. Later, he meets a woman in a gypsy camp called Rupa and falls for her. Aruna, however, cannot forget him and never ceases her search for him. She finally meets him at a show with Rupa. Whether he regains his memory and what eventually happens forms the climax.

Cast 

Main cast
 Sivaji Ganesan as Ashok
 Savitri as Aruna
 Padmini as Roopa
 Nambiar as Sukumar
 Thangavelu
 E. V. Saroja
Guest artiste
 V. Nagayya
Supporting cast
 M. R. Santhanam, M. M. Venkatachalam Pillai, Jayasakthivel, Nambirajan,  Jayaraman, V. P. Balaraman, K. S. Durai, C. V. Velappa,  Saroja, and  Kasthuri.

Soundtrack 
The music was composed by T. Chalapathi Rao. G. Ramanathan composed the music for one song "Nadodikkottam Nannga Thiillelelo" and Carnatic musician G. N. Balasubramaniam composed the music for "Enge Maraindhanayo". This song was tuned in the Carnatic raga Shubhapantuvarali. Lyrics by K. P. Kamatchi Sundharam, Thanjai N. Ramaiah Dass, M. K. Athmanathan, Udumalai Narayana Kavi, A. Maruthakasi and K. S. Gopalakrishnan. The song "Jalilo Jimkana" became popular among children of the decade.

Release and reception 
Amara Deepam was released on 29 June 1956. The Hindu wrote, "Interesting melodrama, packed with cleverly-contrived situations." The Mail wrote, "Savithri as Aruna and Padmini as Rupa are striking in their trying roles, and their actions are moving. Sivaji Ganesan, as Ashok, gives a talk on labour rights, which arrests one's attention." Screen wrote, "Amara Deepam produced essentially as an entertainer, has achieved its purpose to a great extent". Kanthan of Kalki appreciated the film for various aspects, including Sridhar's writing, the songs and the cast performances. The Indian Express wrote, "This is a picture of which the Tamil film world could be legitimately be proud – such is the vivid portrayal on the screen of gripping theme." The film was a commercial success, running for over 100 days in theatres.

References

Bibliography

External links 
 

1950s Tamil-language films
1956 films
1956 romantic drama films
Films directed by T. Prakash Rao
Films scored by T. Chalapathi Rao
Indian remakes of American films
Indian romantic drama films
Tamil films remade in other languages
Indian black-and-white films